Sitophilus is a genus of weevils in the tribe Litosomini. Some species are familiar as pests of stored grain, nut, or seed. Notable pest species include the rice weevil (S. oryzae), wheat weevil (S. granarius), and maize weevil (S. zeamais).

Among the Stiophilus are species which destroy stored wheat, rice, sorghum, oats, barley, rye, buckwheat, peas, cottonseed, processed cereal products such as pasta, cassava, and fruits such as apples.

Distribution
The rice and maize weevils have a nearly cosmopolitan distribution, occurring throughout the warmer parts of the world. In Europe they are replaced by the temperate Palearctic wheat weevil.

Biology
The adult female weevil bores a hole in a grain, nut, or seed, and deposits an egg, usually one egg per individual grain. She seals the hole with a secretion. The larva develops while feeding on the interior of the grain, and then pupates. It usually leaves the grain completely hollow when it exits as an adult. The wheat weevil can live on acorns, and may have used them as a host before agriculture made grain plentiful. The rice weevil can live on beans, nuts, grains, and some types of fruit, such as grapes. Several other Sitophilus use the acorns of oaks such as bluejack oak (Quercus incana) and moru oak (Q. floribunda). Some use the seeds of trees in the Dipterocarpaceae and the legume family, Fabaceae. The tamarind weevil (S. linearis) is only known from the seeds of tamarind.

Several Sitophilus species are hosts to an intracellular γ-Proteobacterium. Weevil and bacterium have a symbiotic relationship in which the bacterium produces nutrients such as amino acids and vitamins for the host, supplementing its cereal diet.

Diversity
As of 1993, there are about 14 species of Sitophilus.

Species include:
Sitophilus conicollis
Sitophilus cribrosus
Sitophilus erosa
Sitophilus glandium
Sitophilus granarius – wheat weevil, granary weevil
Sitophilus linearis – tamarind weevil
Sitophilus oryzae – rice weevil
Sitophilus quadrinotatus
Sitophilus rugicollis
Sitophilus rugosus
Sitophilus sculpturatus
Sitophilus vateriae
Sitophilus zeamais – maize weevil

Fossil taxa include:
Sitophilus punctatissimus

References

External links 

 Obata, H., et al. (2011). A new light on the evolution and propagation of prehistoric grain pests: The world's oldest maize weevils found in Jomon Potteries, Japan. PLoS ONE 6(3) e14785. .

Dryophthorinae
Insect pests of millets
Storage pests